Maria Valéria Rezende (born 1942) is a Brazilian writer and nun. She is a recipient of the Jabuti Prize, Casa de las Américas Prize, and São Paulo Prize for Literature.

Biography 
Rezende was born in Santos. She was a member of the National Student Youth Catholic leadership and, after the 1964 coup d'état, housed militants fighting against the military regime. She joined the Congregation of Our Lady -Canonesses of St. Augustine in 1965

Rezende graduated in French language and literature from the University of Nancy and in Pedagogy from PUC-SP. She holds a master's degree in Sociology from the Federal University of Paraíba. In the 1960s she began to work with popular education, working in different regions of the country and on all continents, in educator training programs. Rezende lived in the backlands of Pernambuco in Recife / Olinda from December 1972 to 1976. She moved to Paraíba in 1976, living in Brejo Paraibano and, since 1988, in João Pessoa.

She published several fiction and non-fiction works.  Her debut in literature was in 2001, with the book Vasto Mundo. She won the 2009 Jabuti Prize in the category of children's literature with No risco do caracol, in 2013, juvenile category, with Ouro dentro da cabeça and in 2015 in the categories romance and Book of the Year of Fiction, with Quarenta dias.

In January 2017, she received the Casa de las Américas Prize for the book Outros Cantos, and for the same novel she won the São Paulo Prize for Literature and the third place at the Jabuti Prize in November 2017.

Works

Novels 

 Vasto Mundo  2001
 O Voo da Guará Vermelha – 2005
 Quarenta Dias - 2014
 Outros cantos - 2016  
 Carta à Rainha Louca - 2019

Short stories and crônicas 

 Modo de Apanhar Pássaros à Mão - 2006 
 A face serena - 2017
 Histórias nada sérias -2017

Children's and young adult books 

 O Arqueólogo do Futuro - 2006
 O Problema do Pato - 2007
 No Risco do Caracol - 2008
 Conversa de Passarinhos – Haikais para crianças de todas as idades (com Alice Ruiz) - 2008
 Histórias daqui e d'acolá – 2009
 Hai-Quintal - Haicais descobertos no quintal – 2011,
 Ouro Dentro da Cabeça  - 2012
 Jardim de Menino Poeta - 2012
 Vampiros e outros sustos - 2013
 Uma Aventura Animal - 2013

References 

Brazilian children's writers
Brazilian women children's writers
21st-century Brazilian women writers
21st-century Brazilian novelists
1942 births
Living people
People from Santos, São Paulo
Augustinian nuns
21st-century Brazilian short story writers
Brazilian women novelists
Brazilian women short story writers
20th-century Brazilian Roman Catholic nuns
21st-century Brazilian Roman Catholic nuns